Christine Ng Wing-mei (born 24 February 1969) is an actress and singer based on Hong Kong. She was under contract to Hong Kong's TVB and ATV.  She is known for her roles in TVB's dramas including C.I.B. Files and The Silver Chamber of Sorrows.

Career
Ng competed in the 1989 Miss Asia Pageant and won Miss Photogenic, finishing as third runner-up.

In December 1990, at age 21, Ng married her first husband Yung Kwong Pui (翁江培) who was 30 years older. Only 13 days into their marriage, Yung died of a heart attack. He had been a high standing partner at the Hong Kong office of Ernst & Young and had accumulated a large fortune. He left Ng $170 million (HKD) in his will. Since Yung had died in China, his will was contested by family members for a lengthy period. In 2000, Ng was awarded $9 million. For many years, she suffered from depression due to negative rumors that she was a "black widow" who had brought bad luck to her late husband, which hurt her success with ATV. She did successfully revive her career after moving to TVB.

In 1999 she met her current husband Kasey Lin Hoi Tong (练海棠) through Gigi Lai, and they married in July 1999 in Vancover.

Filmography

Television dramas

Film

Other shows
 Strictly Come Dancing Season 2《舞动奇迹-第二季》- TVB/Hunan TV dance competition (2008)

References

External links
TVB Blog - Christine Ng

1969 births
Living people
Hong Kong television actresses
Hong Kong film actresses
TVB veteran actors
Chinese beauty pageant winners
20th-century Hong Kong actresses
21st-century Hong Kong actresses
Hong Kong Buddhists